Veracruz, formally Veracruz de Ignacio de la Llave, officially the Free and Sovereign State of Veracruz de Ignacio de la Llave, is one of the 31 states which, along with Mexico City, comprise the 32 Federal Entities of Mexico. Located in eastern Mexico, Veracruz is bordered by seven states, which are Tamaulipas, San Luis Potosí, Hidalgo, Puebla, Oaxaca, Chiapas, and Tabasco. Veracruz is divided into 212 municipalities, and its capital city is Xalapa-Enríquez.

Veracruz has a significant share of the coastline of the Gulf of Mexico on the east of the state. The state is noted for its mixed ethnic and indigenous populations. Its cuisine reflects the many cultural influences that have come through the state because of the importance of the port of Veracruz. In addition to the capital city, the state's largest cities include Veracruz, Coatzacoalcos, Córdoba, Minatitlán, Poza Rica, Boca Del Río and Orizaba.

Etymology
The full name of the state is Veracruz de Ignacio de la Llave. Veracruz was named after the city of Veracruz (From Latin Vera Crux, "True Cross"), which was originally called the Villa Rica de la Vera Cruz. The suffix is in honor of Ignacio de la Llave y Segura Zevallos (1818–1863), who was the governor of Veracruz from 1861 to 1862. The state's seal was authorized by the state legislature in 1954, adapting the one used for the port of Veracruz and created by the Spanish in the early colonial days of the 16th century.

Yanga was a city formed by enslaved Africans who escaped after being brought here from West Africa by Spanish colonists; they reached the mountains, escaping plantations, and lived with the Indigenous people there. The song La Bamba was originally sung by these escapees, who harassed Mexico City with uprisings and attacks on haciendas. Slavery was abolished in this area, years before the Pilgrims landed at Plymouth Rock in what became the Massachusetts Bay Colony.

The enormous mountain range behind Veracruz lowlands was the site of independent communities of refugees, known as maroons, who mixed with the Indigenous peoples in the mountains. In the late 1500s more enslaved people arose and fled to these mountains. The most memorable war, fought by Gaspar Yanga, an enslaved man from Gabon, led to a revolt and a newly developed mountain town. Yanga led raids along the Camino Real pass between Veracruz and Mexico City. In January 1609, the Viceroy of Spain sent royal troops to crush Yanga's rebels. After negotiations and vicious battles, a truce finally was reached.

After 300 years, in 1918, during World War I, the Yangans agreed to move to a town closer to the lowlands, and to accept some local authority. They settled the town of “San Lorenzo de los Negros” within Veracruz. It was officially renamed as “Yanga,” in 1956 and known as the first free town for formerly enslaved people. Descendants in contemporary Veracruz tend to have visual signs of their African ancestry: “negrito” skin tone and some other physical features.

Some Mexicans are unaware or avoid speaking about Afro-descendancy: but terms such as Afro-Mexican, Afro-mestizo or “jarocho,” a term used in and outside Veracruz, refer to this blended cultural legacy. It is featured in street names, music and food, all culled from African roots.

Geography

Political geography
The state is a crescent-shaped strip of land wedged between the Sierra Madre Oriental to the west and the Gulf of Mexico to the east. Veracruz shares common borders with the states of Tamaulipas (to the north), Oaxaca and Chiapas (to the south), Tabasco (to the southeast), and Puebla, Hidalgo, and San Luis Potosí (on the west). Veracruz has  of coastline with the Gulf of Mexico.

Natural geography

The natural geography can be categorized into nine regions: The Sierra de Zongolica, the Tecolutla Region, the Huayacocotla Region, the Metlac River area, the Tuxtlas Region, the Central Region, the Laguna del Castillo Region, the Pueblo Viejo-Tamiahua Region and the Laguna de Alvarado Region. The topography changes drastically, rising from the narrow coastal plains to the highlands of the eastern Sierra Madre. The coast consists of low sandy strips interspersed with tidewater streams and lagoons. Most of the long coastline is narrow and sandy with unstable dunes, small shifting lagoons, and points.

The mountains are of the Sierra Madre Oriental and the Trans-Mexican Volcanic Belt. Mountain ranges include the Sierra de Topila, Sierra de Otontepec, Sierra de Huayacocotla, Sierra de Coxquihui, Sierra de Chiconquiaco, Sierra de Jalacingo, Sierra de Axocuapan, Sierra de Huatusco, Sierra de Zongolica, and the Sierra de Los Tuxtlas. Major peaks include Pico de Orizaba, Cofre de Perote, Cerro de Tecomates, Cerro del Vigía Alta and Cerro de 3 Tortas. The Pico de Orizaba is covered in snow year round; the Cofre de Perote is covered in winter. Major valleys include the Acultzingo, Córdoba, Maltrata, Orizaba and San Andrés.

More than 40 rivers and tributaries provide water for irrigation and hydroelectric power; they also carry rich silt down from the eroding highlands, which is deposited in the valleys and coastal areas. All of the rivers and streams that cross the state begin in the Sierra Madre Oriental or in the Central Mesa, flowing east to the Gulf of Mexico. The important ones include: Actopan River, Acuatempan river, Río Blanco, Cazones River, Coatzacoalcos River, Río de La Antigua, Ayyappan River, Jamapa River, Nautla River, Pánuco River, Papaloapan River, Tecolutla River, Tonalá River, Tuxpan River and Xoloapa River. The largest in terms of water discharge are the Pánuco, Tuxpan, Papaloapan, Coazocoalcos and Uxpanapa. The Panuco, Tuxpan, Papaloapan and Coatzacoalcos are navigable. Two of Mexico's most polluted rivers, the Coatzacoalcos and the Río Blanco are located in the state. Much of the pollution comes from industrial sources, but the discharge of sewerage and uncontrolled garbage disposal are also major contributors. The state has very few sewage treatment plants, with only 10% of sewage being treated before discharge.

The state also has ten major waterfalls and ten major coastal lagoons. There is only one significant lake, called Lake Catemaco. Off the coast are the islands of Isla de Lobos, Isla de los Burros, Isla de Sacrificios, Isla de Salmendina, Isla del Idolo, Isladel Toro, Isla Frijoles, Isla Juan A Ramirez, Isla Pajaros and Isla Terrón and the ocean reefs called Blanquilla, Medio, Tangüillo, Tuxpan, Gualleguilla, Gallega, Anegada de Adento Anegada de Afuera and Cabezo.

Climate

The large variation of altitude results in a large mixture of climates, from cold, snow-topped mountain peaks to hot, humid tropical areas on the coast. 32% of the state is classified as hot and humid, 52% as hot and semi humid, 9% is warm and humid, 6% as temperate and humid and 1% is classified as cold. Cold climates are found at the highest elevations, reaching up to the Cofre de Perote and the Pico de Orizaba. There is a small semi arid region around the city of Perote and the west of the Huasteca area. This is due to a rain shadow caused by the Trans-Mexican Volcanic Belt and the Sierra Madre Oriental, which do not permit the flow of moist Gulf air to this region.

Ecosystems

Various types of forest cover the state, but evergreen tropical forest dominate. The state's ecology is of great importance for many plant and animal species. It is a center of plant endemism and has two separate endemic bird areas.

The northern part of the state as well as the higher mountain areas, are convergence zones between lowland evergreen tropical forests and more temperate flora and fauna. It is also the northernmost occurrence of subhumid tropical forest in Mexico, although little of this remains, mostly on steep slopes. The tropical forests of the Veracruz moist forests ecoregion are situated in the northeastern coastal plain and extend into southern Tamaulipas state, on the east side of the Sierra Madre Oriental. The soils here are volcanic and shallow, but with rich organic matter. Species that predominate include Mayan breadnut (Brosimum alicastrum), sapodilla (Manilkara zapota), rosadillo (Celtis monoica), Bursera simaruba, Dendropanax arboreus, and Sideroxylon capiri. This ecoregion extends into the central part of the state, with vegetation changing to include mahogany (Swietenia macrophylla), sapodilla (Manilkara zapota), Bernoullia flammea, and Astronium graveolens. In the central part of the state, the Veracruz dry forests extend from the Sierra to the coast, south of the Sierra de Chiconquiaco. The Petén–Veracruz moist forests occupy the southern part of the state, and extend eastwards through neighboring Chiapas and Tabasco states into Guatemala.

Veracruz has been described as having one of the richest varieties of wildlife in the western hemisphere. There is an especially diverse array of endemic insects like the conspicuous Arsenura armida. As well as insects, the state is known for its many arachnids, and features over 25 species of tarantula (Theraphosidae), of which many are endemic. The state is part of Birdlife International’s Endemic Bird Area(EBA) project due to the number of endemic birds here. Some of these include green-cheeked amazon (Amazona viridigenalis), Tamaulipas crow (Corvus imparatus), Altamira yellowthroat (Geothlypis flavovelata) and crimson-collared grosbeak (Rhodothraupis celaeno). Despite much of the deterioration of the forest areas, it is still an important stopover for migratory birds as well. Many endangered mammal species can be found here including two endemic rodents (Peromyscus ochraventer and Neotoma angustapalata), the jaguar (Panthera onca), ocelot (Leopardus pardalis), jaguarundi (Herpailurus yaguarondi) and white-nosed coati (Nasua narica). The endangered Baird's tapir may occasionally be spotted in the state's southern jungle regions, such as Biósfera Los Tuxtlas. This region is also the northernmost extent of the primate Alouatta palliata, or mantled howler.

Most of Veracruz's native forests have been destroyed and replaced by scrub and secondary communities of trees. Much of the logging is due to commercial timber, search for tropical hardwoods and the clearing of land for local farmers, especially for cattle grazing. Only 20% of Veracruz's original ecosystem remains, with 64% transformed by human exploitation. Despite some efforts at conservation and reclamation, exploitation continues to put pressure on remaining wild areas.

The state has 31 environmentally protected areas in 21 different municipalities. Nine are urban parks, three are national parks (Pico de Orizaba, Cofre de Perote and San José de los Molinos). The Cofre de Perote National Park is 11,700 hectares of pine and oyamel forest, which was created in 1937. It contains various volcanos such as San Martín and Santa Marta and rich biodiversity as it stretches from sea level to higher elevations, with 16 climate regions groups into four climate types. Forest types range from evergreen tropical rainforest to pine. 75% of species here are also found in Central America and there is a total of 2,368 plant species. Some, such as Costus dirzoi, Daphnopsis megacarpa, Eugenia sotoesparzae, Inga sinacae, Miconia ibarrae, Mormodes tuxtlensis, and Thelypteris rachyflexuosa, are native only to this area. Wildlife includes 102 mammal species, 49 amphibian, 109 reptilian, 561 bird species and more. Species in danger of extinction include the jaguar, spider monkey and anteater.

The Veracruz Reef System is also considered to be a national park and is mostly off the coast of Veracruz city, Boca del Río and Alvarado. There are seventeen reefs in total, some of which jut above the surface to form small islands. This system links with the reef systems of Campeche and Yucatán.

History

Pre-Columbian

The history of the native peoples of the state of Veracruz is complex. In the pre-Columbian period, the modern-day state of Veracruz was inhabited primarily by four indigenous cultures. The Huastecs and Otomis occupied the north, while the Totonacs resided in the north-center. The Olmecs, one of the oldest cultures in the Americas, became dominant in the southern part of Veracruz. Remains of these past civilizations can be found in archeological sites such as Pánuco, Castillo de Teayo, El Zapotal, Las Higueras, Quiahuiztlán, El Tajín, Cempoala, Tres Zapotes and San Lorenzo Tenochtitlán .

The first major civilization in the territory of the current state was that of the Olmecs. The Olmecs lived in the Coatzacoalcos River region and it became the center of Olmec culture. The main ceremonial center here was San Lorenzo Tenochtitlán. Other major centers in the state include Tres Zapotes in the city of Veracruz and La Venta in Tabasco. The culture reached its height about 2600 years ago, with its best-known artistic expression being the colossal stone heads. These ceremonial sites were the most complex of that early time period. For this reason, many anthropologists consider the Olmec civilization to be the mother culture of the many Mesoamerican cultures that followed it. By 300 BCE, this culture was eclipsed by other emerging civilizations in Mesoamerica.

Another major group was the Totonacs, who have survived to the present day. Their region, called Totonacapan, is centered between the Cazones River and the Papaloapan River in the north of the state. Pre-Columbian Totonacs lived from hunting, fishing and agriculture, mostly of corn, beans, chili peppers and squash. This is also the native region of the vanilla bean. Clay sculptures with smiling faces are indicative of this culture. The major site is El Tajín, located near Papantla, but the culture reached its apogee in Cempoala (about five miles (8 km) inland from the current port of Veracruz), when it was conquered by the Aztecs. When the Spaniards arrived in 1519, the territory was still home to a population of about 250,000 people living in fifty population centers and speaking four Totonac dialects. 25,000 were living in Cempoala alone.

The Huastecs are in the far north of the Veracruz and extend into parts of Tamaulipas, Hidalgo, San Luis Potosí, Querétaro and Puebla. The language and agricultural techniques of these people and the Maya are similar; however, only a few buildings and ceramics remain from the early Huastec culture. This culture also reached its peak between 1200 and 1519, when it was conquered by the Spanish.

During the 15th and very early 16th century, the Aztecs came to dominate much of the state and dividing it into tributary provinces, of Tochtepec, Cuetlaxtlan, Cempoallan, Quauhtochco, Jalapa, Misantla, and Tlatlauhquitepec. The Aztecs were interested in the area's vegetation and crops such as cedars, fruit, cotton, cacao, corn, beans and vanilla. However, the Totonacs chafed under Aztec rule, with Aztec rulers from Axayacatl to Moctezuma II having to send soldiers to quell rebellions. The Huastecs were subjugated more successfully by the Aztecs and relegated to the provinces of Atlan and Tochpan.

Colonial period, 1519–1821

Veracruz played an important part in the Spanish conquest of the Aztec Empire by Hernán Cortés and his expedition members. They founded Villa Rica de la Vera Cruz on May 18, 1519, as the first Spanish town in what is now Mexico. By doing so, Cortés threw off the authority of the Governor of Cuba, Diego Velázquez, claiming authority directly from the Spanish crown. A small contingent of the expedition remained at Veracruz, while the main body of conquerors moved inland.

The Totonacs were some of the first people with whom the Spanish had contact on the American mainland. The very first contact was with Captain Juan de Grijalva on the coastline north of the present-day city of Veracruz. Still chafing under Aztec rule, Totonac ruler Tlacochcalcatl welcomed Hernán Cortés and promised 50,000 warriors to help defeat Tenochtitlan. The Spanish helped the Totonacs expel Aztec tribute collectors and seize control of some Aztec outposts. The Spanish founded the port city of Veracruz on the coast, as the first municipality under the direct control of the king of Spain. Cortés then began his march inland to Tenochtitlan. During the Conquest, the rest of the Totonac peoples allied themselves with the Spanish, but the Huastecs, despite also being under Aztec rule, fought against them. After the fall of Tenochtitlan, Cortés sent a regiment to subdue the Huastecs.

During the early conquest era, Cortés distributed the labor of indigenous settlements to particular conquerors in an institution known as encomienda. The indigenous ruler of the settlement was charged with mobilization labor and tribute that was due to the holder of the encomienda. Veracruz had a number of encomiendas that changed hands a number of times, but early on came under the direct control of the Spanish crown rather than individual encomenderos.

During the colonial era, Veracruz was the main port of entry for immigrants from Spain, African slaves, and all types of luxury goods for import and export. The first group of Franciscans arrived in Veracruz in 1524, walking barefoot to the capital of the Spanish colony of New Spain. The route between Veracruz and the Spanish capital of Mexico City, built on the site of the Aztec capital Tenochtitlan, was the key trade route during the colonial era. Much of the history of the state is involved with the port city that Cortés founded in 1519. Veracruz became the principal and often only port to export and import goods between the colony of New Spain and Spain itself. To ensure the port's monopoly, it came to have control over almost all of New Spain's Gulf coastline. New Spain's silver and cochineal red dye, were the two most important exports from the port, along with chocolate, vanilla, chili peppers, and much more were exported. Imported were livestock (sheep, cows, goats, horses), wheat and other cultivars. From the Caribbean, slaves, pineapple, and sugar cane were introduced. This made the port a highly prized target for pirates during the colonial period, with attacks and sackings frequent. This led to the building of the fort of San Juan de Ulúa, a site Juan de Grijalva visited in 1518, and the fortification of the city overall.

Much of Totonac and Huastec culture have survived the colonial period into the present day. Much of the reason for this is that the north of Veracruz is rugged with thick vegetation and relatively little of the resources the Spanish were looking for. Veracruz is considered to be where the "mestizo" or mixed European/indigenous ethnicities began, which is a large part of Mexican cultural identity.

Though the Spaniards had halted the Aztec wars and human sacrifices an unexpected problem arose. European diseases decimated the native population of the province, prompting the importation of African slaves during the colonial period, starting in the 16th century. The Spanish imported between 500,000 and 1,000,000 West African slaves into Mexico between 1535 and 1767 (miscegenation between indigenous and African populations began almost immediately). New Spain did not have any laws prohibiting interracial marriage, hence the correct term is Afro-Mestizo, which includes all 3 ethnicities: Indigenous, African, and Spanish.

Runaway slaves (cimarrones) became problematic to public order since they frequently formed robber bands that attacked travelers on highways. Crown efforts against these groups began in earnest in the late sixteenth century, but a major rebellion broke out in 1606 in the areas of Villa Rica, Nueva Veracruz, Antón Lizardo, and the Rio Blanco area. However, the gravest of these occurred in the Orizaba area, where there were about 500 fugitive slaves. In 1609, a leader named Gaspar Yanga led an insurrection against the Spanish but was defeated in battle. Unrest continued, eventually forcing the government to sign an amnesty pact and giving the Africans the right to form their own community, exacting as a condition that bandits be suppressed. This was called San Lorenzo de Zerral but today it is known as the municipality of Yanga. This was the first time slavery was abolished in the Americas.

In the first half of the seventeenth century, cities such as Córdoba, Orizaba, and Xalapa were formed or expanded to protect the trade route between Mexico City and the port of Veracruz. During this time, the Spanish and mixed-ethnicities population increased as the purely indigenous population continued to fall to a fraction of pre-Conquest levels (due now to mixing, rather than disease). Almost all trade in and out of New Spain had to be with Spain except for some limited trade authorized with England and other Spanish colonies. This would stay in place until 1778, when the Decreto de Libre Comercio, allowing a limited free trade within Spanish-held realms, lifted many of these restrictions on trade with Europe. This would make the port more important than it had been, and led to increased prosperity for the inhabitants.

Outside of the port, in other areas of the province, the economy was based on agriculture, livestock, and commerce. In 1720, Xalapa organized the first trade fair, making it the center for trade between inland Mexican goods and those from abroad. This would lead to its eventual status as the capital of the state.

In 1746, the state was divided into the civil jurisdictions of Pánuco, Tampico, Huayacocotla, Huauchinango, Papantla, Misantla, Xalapa, Jalacingo, Veracruz, Córdoba, Orizaba, Cosamaloapan, Tuxtla, and Cotaxtla.

The port city of Veracruz, and the fort of San Juan de Ulúa, where Cortés landed three hundred years earlier, was where the loyalist soldiers of the Spanish Crown made their last stand against the independence movement in 1824.

Independence

During the Mexican War of Independence, there was support for the insurgents in many parts of the state, with skirmishes erupting in various parts as early as 1811. A major conspiracy against the colonial government was discovered in the port in 1812, with rebels taking Ayahualulco and Ixhuacán during the same year. This forced royalist troops to withdraw to Xalapa. Eventually, this city along with the port were cut off from Mexico City. Most of the state remained in rebel hands during the rest of the war although the commercial class of the port did not support the effort. In 1821, Juan de O'Donojú, the last viceroy of New Spain, came to the port to leave for Spain. However, until 1823, Spanish troops continued to occupy San Juan de Ulúa Fort. In 1826, the city would receive the first of its four titles of "heroic city" for confronting these remaining Spanish troops.

While the last of the Spanish held on in San Juan de Ulúa, Agustín de Iturbide had been declared the emperor of Mexico in 1822. However, his reign quickly encountered resistance from those favoring a republican form of government, including from Antonio López de Santa Anna from his stronghold in Veracruz state. Months later, Iturbide would go into exile and Santa Anna would eventually hold nine terms as president.

The French intervened in Mexico through Veracruz for the first time in the 1838, in what became the Pastry War. The port was blockaded. Efforts to defend the country were coordinated from Xalapa. The port was bombarded, but eventually a settlement was reached.

During the Mexican–American War, the port was blockaded again, this time by the Americans. Initial American attempts in 1847 to land in Alvarado were checked, but the Americans then made a plan to land a few miles south of Veracruz, which surrendered after a 20-day siege, defeated General Santa Anna's forces at the Battle of Cerro Gordo, and marched inland through Xalapa towards Mexico City, led by General Winfield Scott . Mexico surrendered shortly after.

The municipalities of Tuxpan and Chicontepec belonged to Puebla until 1853, when they were annexed to Veracruz to give the state its final form. In 1855, the State Government Palace was constructed. During the Reform War, the major player was Ignacio de la Llave whose name is part of the state's official designation. In 1858, the port became the site for the liberal government under Benito Juárez after he was forced out of Mexico City during the Reform War. Their control of this port and its customs duties allowed liberal forces to gather resources. Conservative forces attacked the state but were repelled from both the port and Xalapa.

The Reform War wrecked Mexico's economy and it found itself unable to pay debts it owed to Europe. As a result, Juárez cancelled Mexico's foreign debt. Spain, Britain and France, all outraged by this action, decided in October 1861 to force repayment of their loans by the occupation of the Mexican Gulf Coast. Normally, this move would have been blocked by the United States under the Monroe Doctrine, however, that nation was occupied with a Civil War at the time, and the European powers believed that the Americans could not act. In December, Spanish troops commanded by general Manuel Gasset occupied the port of Veracruz, without any local resistance, followed a month later by French and British forces. The Spanish and the British withdrew after making deals with Juárez, but the French pushed on to establish the reign of Maximilian I of Mexico. However, this was short-lived and the French were expelled through Veracruz in 1866/67.

In 1863, the state was officially named Veracruz-Llave. After the French were expelled, the state government was in the port of Veracruz. In 1878, the capital was transferred to Orizaba. It was later moved to Xalapa in 1885.

By the end of the century, many infrastructure improvements, such as roads and railways (especially the Ferrocarril Interoceánico) had been completed with the major cities being Veracruz, Orizaba, Xalapa, Córdoba, Jalacingo, Chicontepec and Tantoyuca. The discovery of oil in the north of the state attracted foreign firms, which brought machinery needed for its extraction. These companies included Huasteca Company Petroleum and El Aguila along with American and English firms. During the same time period, uprisings against the government under Porfirio Díaz in the agricultural south of the state were brutally repressed.

20th century to the present
Unrest against the Díaz regime continued until the outbreak of the Mexican Revolution ousted him from power. The major event leading up to this war in Veracruz was the cigar-makers strike of 1905, when more than 5,000 workers of the "El Valle Nacional" company walked off the job. The governor, Teodora A. Dehesa, unsuccessfully tried to negotiate a settlement. The strike went on for months until the strikers won. This victory encouraged more actions, until strikes at the factories in Rio Blanco, Nogales, Santa Rosa and Contón de Orizaba resulted in dramatic violence in January 1907.
No major battles of the Mexican Revolution were fought in the state, though there were skirmishes and attacks on the port. By 1914 rebel Cándido Agular occupied a number of municipalities in the state and in 1917, Venustiano Carranza transferred the federal government here temporarily.

On April 21, 1914, an incident involving U.S. sailors in Tampico led President Woodrow Wilson to land American troops in Veracruz, where they remained for six months. Mexico later responded by severing diplomatic relations.

After the Revolution, agrarian reform, including the redistribution of land and the creation of ejidos took place here. The oil companies in the north of the state were nationalized and consolidated into PEMEX in the 1930s by Lázaro Cárdenas. In the 1950s, more road construction, such as the Mexico City- Poza Rica, Veracruz-Alvarado- Coatzacoalco and Tinajas-Ciudad Aleman-Tlacoatalpan highways were constructed. The Universidad Veracruzana was expanded as well. In 1960, the Museum of Anthropology in Xalapa was inaugurated as well as the Coatzacoalco-Salina Cruz highway. The Veracruz city international airport was opened in the 1970s.

In the ten years after 2006, at least 3,600 people have disappeared within the state. Multiple mass graves have been found within the state. This is seen as part of the over 28,000 missing individuals related to the Mexican Drug War. Within the state the Gulf Cartel and Los Zetas have battled for control. Additionally, this has led to journalists being targeted and killed within the state.

Economy
Veracruz has one of Mexico's leading economies, based on agriculture and petroleum. 
Using relatively recent night light data and electricity consumption in comparison with Gross County Product, the informal sector of the local economy in Veracruz state is shown to have grown during the period of the Fox Administration though the regional government remained PRI. The assumption that the informal economy of Mexico is a constant 30% of total economic activity is not supported at the local level. The small amount of local spatial autocorrelation that was found suggests a few clusters of high and low literacy rates amongst municipios in Veracruz but not enough to warrant including an I-statistic as a regressor. Global spatial autocorrelation is found especially literacy at the macro-regional level which is an area for further research beyond this study. Improved literacy bolsters both the informal and formal economies in Veracruz indicating policies designed to further literacy are vital for growing the regional economy.
While indigenous people are relatively poor, little evidence was found that the informal economy is a higher percentage of total economic activity in a municipio with a high share of indigenous people. While the formal economy might have been expanding relative to the informal economy in 2000, by 2006 this process had been reversed with growing informality. While rural municipios have smaller economies, they are not different than urban municipios in the share of the economy that is informal. Programs in the past that might move economic activity from the informal to the formal sector have not succeeded suggesting public finance issues such as tax evasion will continue to plague the state with
low government revenues.

Agriculture

The primary sector of the economy (agriculture, forestry and fishing) has been important since pre-Hispanic times and continues to be important both as a source of income as well as culturally. The state has abundant rainfall and extremely fertile soils, as well as a long coastline and forest containing a wide variety of trees and other plants.

There is about 1 million hectares of cultivable land, half of which is in private hands and 43% is ejido or communal land. The rest is occupied by human settlements. There are 3,620 ejidos parceled out to 270,000 ejido members. 52.5% of agricultural land is used for the growing of crops or used as pasture and 43.1% is forest or rainforest. Chief agricultural products include coffee, vanilla, sugarcane, tobacco, bananas, coconuts, and vegetables, but local farmers depend mainly on corn and beans. Two corn crops per year are generally produced, planted on 644,936 hectares with a production of 1,114,325 tons. The state is the leading national producer of coffee, sugarcane, corn, and rice. Coffee is grown on 152,993 hectares producing 400,575 tons. Export earnings from this crop are about US$232 million annually. Most coffee is grown in the mountain areas of Córdoba-Huatusco, Coatepec-Teocelo-Cosautlán and Misantla-Tlapacoyan-Atzalan. Sugarcane is cultivated on 254,000 hectares, producing 16,867,958 tons annually. Veracruz is the largest producer of rice with 24,000 hectares producing 120,000 tons. Much is this crop is protected by import bans from Asia. 

The state grows half of the country's citrus fruit and grows the most kinds. This occupies 180,577 hectares and produces 2,575,140 tons annually. Varieties include oranges, tangerines, mandarins, limes and grapefruit. Most citrus is grown in the north of the state, and much of the lime crop is exported, supporting a packing and shipping industry. Veracruz is the largest mango producer in the country, grown on 31,640 hectares producing 287,000 tons. Most of this is the manila variety, which is preferred in Mexico. 95% of this crop is consumed fresh within Mexico although exports to Canada have begun.  Vanilla beans are native to the state, which is the primary producer for Mexico. Most of this crop is grown in an area known as Totonacapan in and around Papantla.

Livestock raising is an important activity. There are over 300,000 units of production most of which raise cattle, with Veracruz being the main beef producer for the country at 14% of the total. In addition to beef cattle, dairy cattle, pigs, sheep, goats, horses, domestic fowl, and bees are raised.

From the tropical forests of the inland regions come dyewoods, hardwoods, and rubber. About 20% of the state's territory is forested, with 220,000 of temperate forest and 1,200,000 hectares of tropical forests. Logging in the state produces 128,254 m3 of wood products per year. The most exploited species include pine, oyamel, cypress and oak. Some tropical hardwoods are harvested as well.

Veracruz's long coastline supports a large fishing industry, producing one-fifth of Mexico's catch. Most of the country's mojarra, oysters and shrimp come from here. Other major fish catches include crab, sea bass and red snapper.

Agroindustry focuses on the processing of coffee and sugar products, with citrus packers holding an important position as well.

Natural resources

Today, the state of Veracruz, rich in natural resources, is an important component of Mexico's economy. Approximately 35% of Mexico's water supply is found in Veracruz. There are a number of metallic and non-metallic mineral mining but the most important resource is oil.

The mountains contain relatively unexploited deposits of gold, silver, iron, and coal. Although Veracruz is an important source of metals such as iron and copper, a great deal of its mining involves non-metallic minerals as sulfur, silica, feldspar, calcium, kaolin and marble. The state is ranked fourth in the nation for this kind of mining production. However, mining only accounts for 1.5% of economic activity for the entire state.

Veracruz was a pioneer in both the extraction and refining of petroleum products. The state has about one-fourth of Mexico's petroleum reserves and ranks third in petroleum production. Most of this production is concentrated in the northern part of the state. Petrochemicals represent 28.1% of the state's manufacturing and ranks first nationally. There are 22 petrochemical plants, with the most important being La Cangrejera, Jáltipan de Morelos, Poza Rica, Cosoleacaque, Pajaritos and Minatitlán.

Golden Lane Oil Fields

The "Golden Lane" ("Dos Bocas-Alamo structure" or The Ridge") refers to a series of oil fields aligned in an arc onshore and a symmetrical alignment offshore, forming two sides of a Cretaceous atoll 180 km long. The structure was discovered in 1908 by Weetman Pearson's Mexican Eagle Petroleum Company San diego de la Mar No. 1 well, which flowed 2,500 bbl/day. The Golden Lane oil fields penetrate a massive elliptical reef platform, identified as the Sierra del Abra limestone (consisting of reef, backreef and lagoonal facies), which dips southeast. The site for the discovery well was selected due to the presence of petroleum seeps, just as was Edward Laurence Doheny's La Paz No. well in the Ebano-Panuco petroleum district west of Tampico, Tamaulipas, the first Mexican discovery well in 1904. In 1908, the infamous Dos Bocas oil fire occurred after the San Diego de la Mar No. 3 blowout. This was followed by the Potrero del Llano No. 4 well, flowing 100,000 bbl per day during the three months it was out of control. Doheny's Cerro Azul No. 4 well, located by Ezequiel Ordonez, became the largest daily production record holder in 1916 at 260,000 bbl. Geophysical studies, in particular gravimetry, starting in 1920 led to the discovery of the Poza Rica Field in 1932 and Moralillo Field in 1948, on the west flank of the Golden Lane in the Tamabra forereef facies. Refraction seismography surveys started in 1930, augemented in 1948 with reflection seismography, which led to the discovery of the southern extent of the atoll with the Ezequiel Ordonez No. 1 well in 1952 and additional discoveries through 1968. Marine seismic and magnetometer surveys starting in 1957 showed the extent of the atoll offshore and led to the first offshore well, Isla de Lobos No. 1-B, in 1963. The depths of wells are on the order of 500 m onshore and 2000 m offshore.

Industry, transportation and commerce

Laguna Verde Nuclear Power Plant (LVNPP) in Alto Lucero, Veracruz, produces about 4.5% of Mexico's electrical energy.

The manufacturing industry in Veracruz accounts for between 21% and one-third of the state's gross domestic product, and approximately 64% of the manufacturing industry GDP is generated by the chemical and petrochemical sectors. Other products produced include metals, processed foods, beverages, printing and publishing, textiles and machinery. Most of the state's industry takes place in the municipalities of Coatzacoalcos, Minatitlán, Cosoleacaque, Poza Rica, Córdoba, Orizaba, Tuxpan and Veracruz, with over 5,000 establishments. The rest is divided among nearly 11,000 smaller establishments. There are five major industrial parks: Bruno Pagliai, Ixtac, Petroquimico Morelos, Córdoba-Amatlán and Parque 2000.

Transportation and commerce are important factors in the state, mostly linked to importing and exporting through its four deepwater ports. The focus of most of these activities is the port of Veracruz. It has the most favored position on Mexico's Gulf coast and is extensively used for exports to the United States, Latin America and Europe. Seventy-five percent of all port activity in Mexico takes place in Veracruz. The chief exports of this state are coffee, fresh fruits, fertilizer, sugar, fish and crustaceans. Other ports include those in Tuxpan and Coatzacoalcos. Most highway, rail and air connections link to the port of Veracruz and other ports to the south. The state has 73 companies that have been classified as high-volume exporters and it is ranked sixth in the country for exports. The state contains five major food wholesale markets, 146 government sponsored markets, about 75,000 private stores and 201 supermarkets. Wholesale vendors focus on agricultural products such as wood, livestock and food products. The major focal point for international business is the World Trade Center EXPOVER in Boca del Río.

In the industrial sector, relatively poor municipios are not catching up to relatively rich ones though the latter are not diverging either. A policy of encouraging much more domestic and/or foreign investment is called
for if poorer areas are to prosper and the outflow of residents is to stop.

Handcrafts
In the more rural and indigenous areas of the state, a number of handicrafts are still made and sold both to local buyers and to tourists. Many of these crafts are produced by communities that specialize in one or more types. Wood furniture and other items are made by the Huasteca people, mostly using cedar and palm trees. The best work comes from the towns of Ozulama and Castillo de Teayo. Teocelo and Monte Blanco are known for bamboo furniture and other items. Musical instruments of wood such as a guitar called “jarana” are constructed in the Los Tuxtlas area, especially in Catemaco, with flutes made in Papantla. Wooden masks are made in Teocelo, and items made with the wood of coffee plants are made in Misantla, Coatepec, Huastusco and Xico. Corn husks are used to make decorative figures, often religious,  in Nautla and Naranjos de Amatlán. Palm fronds are woven into fans, shoes and baskets in Jalcomulco, Ozulama and Tlalixcoyan.

Ceramics have been made in almost all parts of Veracruz since the Olmecs. One area known for its work is Papantla which also includes life sized representations of folk dancers from the area along with more mundane items of glazed and unglazed pottery. Minatitlán is known for its production of ceramic cooking utensils which are also popular in the neighboring municipalities of Actopan and Naolinco. San Miguel Aguasuelos and Jalcomulco are known for their white clay wares which include water jars, toys, nativity scenes, bells and more.

Traditional clothing and embroidery can be most easily found in the La Huasteca area, where elaborately decorated women's blouses can be seen, especially in the El Higo and Tlalixcoyan area. In Totonacalpan, men are still often seen in white shirts and pants with a bag to hold personal items. This dress dates back to the early colonial period and had not changed much since then. Other areas specialize in wool items such as Naranjos de Amatlán, Minatilán and the city of Veracruz where items such as dresses, skirts and jackets. These and other textiles such as tablecloths and napkins are often decorated with cross-stitch. Leather items include shoes, jackets, bags, wallets, belts and boots and are usually made in the La Huasteca region, Teocolo, Citlaltépetl and Naolinco.

Culture

Gastronomy

The gastronomy of the state is unique in Mexico and mixed Spanish, indigenous, and other influences. From the pre-Hispanic period, the cuisine of the state was unique. The staple triumvirate of corn, beans, and squash was supplemented by tropical fruits, vanilla beans, and an herb called acuyo or hoja santa. Another important native contribution is seafood, which is featured in many dishes such as, arroz a la tumbada and caldo de mariscos (seafood soup).

After the conquest and during the colonial period, many other spices and ingredients were brought and have had a greater influence in the cooking here than in other parts of the country. From Europe, the Spanish brought saffron, parsley, thyme, marjoram, bay laurel, and cilantro as well Asian spices such as cloves, cinnamon, and black pepper. The Spaniards also brought wheat, rice, almonds, olives and olive oil, garlic, and capers. The latter three are essential ingredients in what is perhaps the most famous specialty of the region, huachinango a la veracruzana, red snapper in a spicy tomato sauce. Caribbean imports such as sugar cane and pineapple were adapted as well as the peanut, brought from Africa by the Portuguese (although the peanut is originally from South America).

Veracruz cuisine divides into six regions called Sotavento, Centro Norte, Centro Sur, Sierra, Costa Norte, and Los Tuxtlas. The Sotovento area is in the south of the state, and the dishes here are heavily based on rice. Common dishes include arroz a la tumbada, which is rice cooked with seafood or meat and rice with fried bananas. Seafood dishes are also prominent based mostly on fish and shrimp. A common ingredient in dishes is a herb called “hoja santa” or “hierba Santa,” which is a plant of the family Piperaceae. The Centro Norte is centered on Xalapa. Dishes here tend to be more indigenous in nature, heavily flavored with mild chili peppers. Common dishes here include Chilehuates, similar to a tamale, stuffed chile peppers, and enchiladas. Less seafood and more pork and domestic fowl are consumed. The Centro Sur area is mostly indigenous and encompasses the area of, Huatusco, Coscomatepec, Cotaxtla, Orizaba, Amatlán, Huilango y las españolas Córdoba y Fortín de las Flores, la negra Yanga and San Lorenzo de los Negros. Dishes here are similar to Centro Norte, but chayotes appear more often as this region is a major producer of the vegetable. Meats in adobo sauce are common as well. The Sierra and Costa Norte encompass the northern part of the state, such as the Pánuco River area and Totonacapan. This area is noted for a number of unique dishes such as frijoles en achuchutl, made with black beans, pork rind, chayotes, squash seeds, and jalapeño peppers. Bocoles are a kind of filled tortilla made with corn dough, stuffed with black beans, chorizo, eggs, or seafood, which then are fried in lard. Tamales are often made with banana leaves. The area is also known for its breads, especially anise–flavored rolls. The Los Tuxtlas area is centered on the communities of Santiago, San Andrés and Catemaco, which were the center of the Olmec civilization. The cuisine in this area features yucca, “chocos” (a type of edible flower), fish, especially mojarra, and exotic meats such as monkey, and iguana.

Museums

The state capital of Xalapa is also home to a number of important museums. The Museum of Anthropology contains the second most important collection of Mesoamerican artifacts in the country. It was built beginning in 1959 over six hectares. The complex is divided into various halls and galleries by theme, focusing on the Olmec and Totonac cultures. The Patio Olmeca contains the colossal head found in 1945 and known as El Rey (The King). Other important artifacts include giant stelae and San Martin Pajapan Monument 1 (at right).
The Museum of Science and Technology is in Xalapa. It contains more than 400 exhibitions in eight halls: Life, Ecology, Space, Transportation, Sciences, Energy, Water and Earth. The Pinoteca Diega Rivera was established by the state in the former Monastery of San Francisco in Xalapa. Its primary function is to preserve and display Rivera’s works owned by the state, but it also contains early works by José María Velasco, Jorge Cuesta and Teodoro A. Dehesa. Near the city is the Hacienda del Lencero, which was the home and headquarters of President Antonio López de Santa Anna in the 19th century. It has been preserved and turned into a museum.

In Tuxpan is the Regional Museum of Anthropology with more than 400 pieces from pre-Hispanic groups in the region, displayed in four halls. Most of the pieces come from the center of the state and from the Huasteca region.On the edge of the Tuxpan River.The city also has the Mexican-Cuban Museum. It contains a collection of photographs from the Cuban Revolution as well as a statue of José Martí .

Other museums are scattered in other parts of the state. The Salvador Ferrando Museum is located in Tlacotalpan and contains many everyday items and art from the 16th to the 19th centuries.The Tuxteco Regional Museum in Santiago de Tuxtla contains Olmec and Totonac artifacts including art objects, farming implements, utensils and more. In the garden area, there are giant stone sculptures from the Tres Zapotes site. The Jardín Central (Central Garden) of the municipality of Tierra Blanca has a number of Totonac archeological pieces on display. The Archeological Museum of Córdoba is in the city of the same name with three exhibition halls containing artifacts from the Maya, Olmec, Toltec and Huastec cultures. There is also a collection of historical photographs of the city. The Veracruz State Art Museum (Museo de Arte del Estado de Veracruz) is located in Orizaba in what was the monastery associated with the Concordia Church. Its collection includes works by Diego Rivera, Ignacio Rosas and Gonzalo Argüelles. It also contains a collection of historical photographs related to Veracruz and art. The Malintzin Archeological Museum is in the municipality of Nogales. It is a small museum with one hall, with photographs and documents. It is located in the church where Malinche and Juan de Jaramillo were supposedly married.

Fairs and festivals
The state is noted for its quantity and variety of festivals. The most important of these is Carnival in the city of Veracruz. This city's version of the event begins with the “burning of bad humor,” which is represented in effigy. A number of kings and queens are "crowned" including categories for children but the most important is the Rey Feo (Ugly King) and the Reina del Carnaval (Queen of the Carnival). The latter is accompanies by cadets from the Naval Academy during the parade. This celebration is repeated all along the Veracruz coastline with other significant festivities taking place in Alvarado, Coatzacoalcos, San Rafael and Villa José Cardel. Minatitlán's celebration draws people from the nearby states of Oaxaca and Tabasco. Day of the Dead is celebrated in almost all of Mexico from 31 Oct to 2 November but there are local twists in the state. In some places, it is commemorated during the months of August and September. In Papantla, boards or tables are placed on rooftops, which have been adorned with flowers, plant matter and more. In Tantoyuca, it is commemorated with costumes and music, similar to Carnival.

The Christian celebration of Candlemas is fused with traditions associated with Chalchiuhtlicua, the goddess of water, rivers, lakes and ocean. She was replaced by the Virgin of Candlemas, the protector of fishermen, making this celebration particularly important on the coast, especially in Tlacotalpan, where it is celebrated with much pomp. In Jáltipan de Morelos, ethnic Nahuas and Popolucas dress in elaborate costumes and arrange their hair in intricate styles. In Santa María Magdalena, on 22 July, bulls are set free to roam the streets. Corn harvest festivals are prominent in the Huasteca region in municipalities such as Chontla, Chicontepec, and Ixhuatlán de Madero. These generally include native dances and foods based on corn.

Dance and music

The state is well known in the country for its music and dance. The fandango is a dance brought over from Spanish. Today the state has two varieties: the jarocho and the huasteco. Indigenous and folk dances in the state are most often associated with rituals and religious festivals. These include one called Los Lisceres also called the Tigres from the Los Tuxtlas region. Participants wear Olmec style masks which represent the rain god Tlalóc. Another is Los Guaguas in which the participants pay homage to the sun, and Los Santiagos, which is related to the veneration of Saint James, patron saint of Hernán Cortés. One last one is called Los Negritos (The Little Black Ones) which was created by African slaves. According to tradition, the origin of this dance lies in a story about a boy who was bitten by a snake and the rituals his family held to heal him.

However, the state's most famous dance is as much a ritual and daredevil act as movements performed to music. The Danza de los Voladores (Dance of the Flyers) is a ceremony/ritual which has its roots in the pre-Hispanic period and presently best known as associated with the town of Papantla, Veracruz. It is believed to have originated with the Nahua, Huastec and Otomi peoples in central Mexico, and then spread throughout most of Mesoamerica. The ritual consists of dance and the climbing of a 30-meter pole from which four of the five participants then launch themselves tied with ropes to descend to the ground. The fifth remains on top of the pole, dancing and playing a flute and drum. According to myth, the ritual was created to ask the gods to end a severe drought. Although the ritual did not originate with the Totonac people, today it is most strongly associated with them, especially those in and around Papantla, as the ceremony has died off in most other places. The ceremony was named an Intangible Cultural Heritage by UNESCO in order to help the ritual survive and thrive in the modern world.

The state's best-known musical style is called the "son". A “son” is a musical variation which traces its origins to Spain and developed during the 17th and 18th centuries. It is the state's most popular musical style shows influences from the many peoples who have lived here such as indigenous groups, Portuguese, Italians, Africans, French and others. The music is generally performed by harps, violins and guitars, with an occasional wind instrument. Son huasteco (also called son huapango) is a variety of son played in the north of the state mostly among the Totonacs. Son jarocho is the better known and more popular variety played in the south of the state. The famous Grammy award-winning song "La Bamba" by Los Lobos is said have its roots in a traditional folk song from Veracruz (hence the reference to the "Marinero" in that song).

The state has produced a number of musicians famous in the country. One of the best known is Francisco Gabilondo Soler. Gabilondo Soler is best known for creating a character known as “Cri-cri”, a singing cricket for a radio show in the first half of the 20th century. As a musician, he specialized in writing children's songs such as "Abuelito", "Caminito de la escuela", "El baile de los muñecos", "El burrito" and "La negrita Cucurumbé". A number of his works have been translated into other languages. Another famous musician is Agustín Lara, who has had more international fame. Nicknamed "Flaco de oro" (golden skinny one), he always insisted that he was born in Tlacotalpan, Veracruz and not Mexico City as records show. Lara formed his first band in 1930 called El Son de Marabú and toured almost continuously in Mexico and abroad during his career. His most famous compositions include "Veracruz", "Noche de Ronda" and "Solamente una vez". Other prominent musicians include Toña "La Negra" or María Antonia del Carmen Peregino, Narcisco Serradel, Lorenzo Barcelata and María Greever.

Art and architecture

During the colonial era, a movement called the “estilo veracruzano” (Veracruz style) developed mostly focusing on landscapes in the state with a certain amount of indigenous influence although the painters themselves were criollo or Mexico-born Spanish. These paintings focus on the mountains, valles, coasts, volcanos and other natural phenomena in the state. Most of the proponents of this were born in Veracruz itself and include José Justo Montiel (1824–1899), Gonzalo Argüelles Bringas (1877–1942), Eugenio Landecio (teacher of José María Velasco), Natal Pesado and Ignacio Rosas.

However, most of Veracruz's best-known artists are from the 19th and 20th centuries. In the 19th century, these include Miguel Mata Reyes, Salvador Ferrando, José María Jara, Enrique Guerra and Alberto Fuster. Miguel Mata Reyes is best known for his contributions to the design of the Palacio de Bellas Artes as well a portrait of Antonio López de Santa Anna. Salvador Ferrando was a portrait and landscape artist from the north of the state. Until recently, most of his work had been hidden in a museum named after him in the Tlacotalpan region. Much of it now is on display at the Museo de Arte de Veracruz in Orizaba. José María Jara is noted for his paintings of Veracruz customs, whose works include El Velorio, which was presented at the World's Fair in Paris. Enrique Guerra was an important sculptor at the end of the 19th century. His best-known works are bas reliefs and include Asesinato de César, Coroliano, Thais and Crisálida. Alberto Fuster was most active at the end of the century and is noted for bringing symbolism painting to Mexico from his stay in Europe. His works include El progreso, Safo en el templo de Delfos and Nativa con loro.

There are three important artists from the 20th century, Carlos Bracho, Norberto Martínez and Teodoro Cano García. Active in the first half of the century, sculptor Carlos Bracho's work has been compared to that of Juan Rulfo. His works have been done in plaster, bronze, terracotta and green onyx and include monumental works which can be found in the cities of Xalapa, Puebla, Pachuca and Mexico City. His best-known works are El abrazo, Cabeza verde and El campesino se apodera de la tierra. Norberto Martínez only lived 45 years but is considered one of the most prolific of Mexican painters who dedicated most of his works to social themes. A number of these are early murals such as El comercio in the Jáuregi de Xalapa market as well as an untitled work in a private home in Córdoba which deals with the fusion of the Spanish, indigenous and African ethnicities in Mexico. Later works include the three murals in the main stairwell of the School of Law at the University of Xalapa and El hombre y el conocimiento at the Universidad Veracruzana. Teodoro Cano García is one of Mexico's most famous muralists of the late 20th century, famous for the promotion of the Totonac culture of his hometown of Papantla. He has created paintings, sculptures, etchings, photography and mixed media works with his murals and sculptures most acclaimed. Examples of his work can be seen in various parts of public buildings in Papantla.

Most of Veracruz's older architecture can be found in the inland cities of Xalapa and Córdoba. Despite being the first Spanish settlement, the city of Veracruz lost most its older structures to the various invasions it has suffered. Architecture from the 16th to the 19th century includes colonial Spanish, Moorish, Neo gothic and Neoclassical. From the 20th century on, a number of names stand out. Armando Bravo Ramírez remodeled the State Government Palace and the facade of the Capillas de Ánimas, both in Xalapa. Other prominent names responsible for many projects in the state include Luis González Aparicio, Bernal Lascuraín Rangel and Luis Manuel Tello Deschamps.

Literature
The literary arts reached their peak in Veracruz starting in the 19th century and extends to the “Generation of the 1950s.” Salvador Díaz Mirón is one of Veracruz's most-distinguished poets. Over his lifetime from the latter 19th to early 20th centuries, he worked as a professor, politician and journalist contributing to periodicals such as El Veracruzano, El Orden, and El Imparcial. His creative works include some of the first Romantic pieces produced in Mexico such as Oda a Víctor Hugo, Ojos verdes, Gloria and Voces interiores. Other works include Poesías A Tirsa, Nox (also known as Claudia) and his last works such as Al buen cura and La mujer de nieve. He became a member of the Academia Mexicana de la Lengua and is buried at the Rotonda de los Hombres Ilustres in Mexico City. María Enriqueta Camarillo was one of a number of women writers to gain prominence in Mexico at the end of the 19th century. While she wrote a number of works such as Jirón del mundo, Sorpresas de la vida and El Secreto, she is best known for Rosas de la infancia, with which many Mexicans learned to read.

Writers born at the end of the 19th century, such as Gregorio López y Fuentes, Manuel Maples Arce and Jorge Mateo Cuesta Porte-Petit were often concerned with social issues. Works of this type include El Indio by López, Metrópolis by Maples and a poem called Canto a un dios mineral by Cuesta. The following generation, born in the first decades of the 20th century, became known as the Generation of the 1950s. During this time Veracruz's literary tradition consolidated and decided to break type. One example is Juan Hernández Ramírez’s writing of poetry in the Nahuatl spoken in the La Huasteca area of Veracruz. One important name from this generation is Emilio Carballido who wrote about 100 plays as well as scripts for radio and television. Some of his works include Rosalba y los llaveros, Felicidad and Las visitaciones del Diablo. In 1996, he won the Premio Nacional de Literatura and in 2002 he received the Ariel de Oro for his work in cinema.

Religion
The Catholic patron saint of Veracruz is Rafael Guízar y Valencia.

Education
Public education in the state is supervised by the state Dirección General de Educación Popular and the Dirección General de Educación Media Superior y Superior. The current system is the result of a number of reforms which took place in the 1980s and 1990s. In the late 1990s, 302 new school campuses were created statewide and 257 schools were remodeled. These included new schools for special education, distance learning and technological institutes, giving the state one of the highest number of school campuses in the country. There are a total of 20,479 schools, with nearly 2 million students and about 85,000 teachers. 93% of schools are in the basic education category (preschool, primary and middle schools. Preschools also include those geared towards the indigenous populations, focusing on bilingual and bicultural education in both the indigenous language/culture and Spanish. One major focus of these and other schools is to eliminate illiteracy in indigenous communities. The "Medio Superior" level includes vocational high school and technical colleges. These account for 6.6% of schools in the public system. The Superior level includes teachers’ colleges and universities. There are 166 institutes at this level, with about 68,000 students studying 221 different majors. There are also 63 master's degree programs and six PhDs. These institutions serve about 135,000 students accounting for about 19% of the college-aged population (19- to 24-year-olds), slightly below the national average of 24%.

The major state university is the Universidad Veracruzana, with offers 56 bachelor's degrees, 37 masters and 5 PhDs. It is based in the capital of Xalapa and is noted for its large and varied sports programs. There are campuses in fourteen other cities. About 37% of university students attend the main public university, with a student population of 47,000 undergraduates and 2,000 postgraduates. Other important schools include Instituto Tecnologico de Veracruz in Veracruz, Universidad Anáhuac in Xalapa, Universidad de Xalapa in Xalapa, ITESM in Córdoba, Universidad Cristóbal Colón in Veracruz, the Veracruz Naval Academy and the Instituto Tecnológico del Mar.

Demographics

The state of Veracruz, especially its port, has been a crossroads for various cultures since the very early colonial period. The port of Veracruz has brought cargo, sailors, seamen, and slaves from various parts of the world, especially from the Caribbean and Europe. The state has indigenous cultural influences mixed with those from Europe, Africa and the Afro-Caribbean. These can be best seen in the music, the culinary traditions and in the people themselves.

The number of ethnic communities in the state has been calculated at 2,062. The most numerous include the Nahuas, Totonacs, Huastecs, Popolucs, Zapotecas, Chinantecas, Otomis, Mazatecas, Tepehuas, Mixtecas, Zoques, Mixes, Mayas and Tzotzils, all indigenous groups. The largest are Nahuas, who make up over half of the indigenous population. Most native communities can be found in 68 municipalities especially in Tehuipango, Mixtla de Altamirano, Astacinga, Soledad Atzompa, Atlahuilco, Tequila, Tlaquilpan, Los Reyes, Magdalena, San Andres Tenejapan, Tantoyuca, Zongolica, Chicontepec, Papantla, Ixhuatlán de Madero, Soteapan, Playa Vicente, Mecayapan y Coyutla, Benito Juárez, Coxquihi, Espinal, Filomeno Mata, Ixcatepec, Mecatlán and Zozocolco de Hidalgo. In 1998, about 10% of the population spoke an indigenous language; however, this does not take into account all indigenous peoples. The census of 2005 counted 605,135 as speaking an indigenous language.

There are also small immigrant communities of Spaniards, Italians, Basque and Lebanese. Africans were first brought to Mexico through slavery to the Veracruz port. At one point, they outnumbered Europeans and a significant number ran away from haciendas and plantations to form their own communities, sometimes allied with indigenous groups. One such rebellion was led by Yanga, who successfully negotiated a free African community with Spanish authorities in 1609. Like other groups, many of African descent would intermarry with other groups, with the category of “mulatto” existing in the old colonial caste system for those with African blood. Today, the vast majority of Afro-Mexicans in Veracruz and other parts of the country are spread out and intermixed with the rest of the population. According to the 2020 Census, 2.67% of Veracruz's population identified as Black, Afro-Mexican, or of African descent.

With a population of 7,110,214 (2005), Veracruz is the third most populous entity in the country, after the Federal District of Mexico City and the State of Mexico. Population growth has slowed in the state in the last decades, due to lower birthrates and the exodus of migrants, mostly men. Women outnumber men. One reason for the decline in birthrates is the elevation of education levels, especially among women. Another is urbanization, with about one-third of the state's population living in urban centers, especially Veracruz, Xalapa, Coatzacoalcos, Minatitlán and Papantla. Most (90%) of the state's communities, outside of municipal seats have fewer than 500 people and contain only 21% of the total population. The migration of men outside the state has put more women into the state's workforce. Approximately 75% of the population is under 45 years of age and 30% under the age of 15.

Life expectancy is just under the norm for the rest of the country. The overwhelming majority of people in the state are Catholic, however, there is a significant Protestant minority and a number who profess the Jewish faith.

Tourism
Tourism mostly centers on the port city of Veracruz but there are other destinations. There are over 1,000 hotels in the state, over half of which are small, family-owned enterprises. Almost all of the four and five-star establishments are in metropolitan area of Veracruz. Many of the state major historical and cultural monuments are located in the port of Veracruz. Some of these include the Aquarium, the Museum of the city (Museo de la Ciudad), The Agustín Lara Museum, the Santiago Fortress (Baluarte de Santiago) the "Las Atarazanas" Museum and the San Juan de Ulúa Fort.

To the north of the port city is the Sierra or Totonacalpan area of the state, home to the Totonac people. This is home to the important pre-Hispanic city of El Tajín and the present-day city of Papantla. The area is also the native habitat of the vanilla bean.

To the south of the port is on the coast, is Catemaco. This is in a tropical area. The area's two main features are Lake Catemaco, which is located in the crater of an extinct volcano and Isla Tanaxpillo just off the coast. This island is also called the island of the monkeys or baboons due to a group of feral monkeys that escaped and found refuge here.

Inland is the coffee-growing region in and around the cities of Coatepec and Xalapa. Orizaba is best known for the volcano nearby but also has a large waterfall called El Elefante and a Cañon (Canyon) de Río Blanco.

Archeological sites

The state contains numerous remains of pre-Hispanic Olmec, Totonac, and Huastec cities. El Tajín, a ruined city that reached its apex between the 9th and 13th centuries ad, was designated a UNESCO World Heritage site in 1992.

El Zapotal is an archeological site which was discovered in 1971 in a region known at Mixtequlla (between the Blanco and Papaloapan Rivers). This site is noted for its clay figurines with smiling faces, part of an extremely large offering in honor of the god of death Mictlantecuhtli.

Cempoala is an archeological site located on the coast between the modern settlements of La Antigua and Ciudad Cardel. It was occupied when Hernán Cortés arrived, and he managed to form an alliance with the Totonacs here against the Aztecs. In the center of the site, there is a large plaza surrounded by temples and the palace of the Totonac chief. The site also has a small museum.

Quiahuiztlán is on the coast on a small mountain named Bernal. It is cut into the mountain as a series of terraces. It is located very close to where Cortés founded the initial Spanish settlement of Villa Rica de la Vera-Cruz.

The Castillo de Teayo (Teayo Castle) is really a pyramid, whose original name was Zapotitlán. It is located on the border between Huasctec and Totonac lands. It was abandoned in the 19th century.

The largest and most important site is El Tajín, located near the city of Papantla. The name is from the Totonac language and means “thunder,” but no one knows what the true name of this city was. It is also unknown if the Totonac built it, but since they have dominated the region for centuries, they lay claim to it.The city developed from the end of the Classic period and the beginning of the Post Classic period, between 800 and 1150 C.E. It is divided into five zones, the Plaza del Arroyo Group, the Central Zone, the Gran Xicalcoliuhqui, Tajín Chico and the Column Complex. Its signature building is the Pyramid of the Niches, named after the 365 niches built into the levels of the structure. The site has a large number of Mesoamerican ball game courts, one with details reliefs showing the beheading of a ballplayer and his role in the afterlife.

The Tres Zapotes site is located the community of the same name. Covering 1.5 hectares, the main building has a square base, which is surrounded by gardens and trees. The most important find from his is Stele “C” which is on display at the Museo Nacional de Antropología in Mexico City.

El Pital is a site in the municipality of Martínez de la Torre. It consists of a mound with a pyramid base and stairs on the east side.The site's culture is considered to be a link between the coastal and highland cultures of the region.

Los Idolos is a site in the municipal city of Misantla, and was an important ceremonial site for the Totonacapan region. It consists of four rectangular patios linked by platforms and flat-topped mounds. Many of the structures are decorated with smooth river stone, thought to have come from the Misantla River.

The Centro Ceremonial Cuajilote is located on the Bobos River. It consists of a large plaza 400 meters long lined with structures. In the center of the plaza there are three shrines, one of which contains phallic figures.

Government
Veracruz became a state in 1824. Its government is headed by a governor, who is elected to a single term of six years. Members of the unicameral legislature, the State Congress, are elected to three-year terms. The state is divided into 212 local governmental units called municipios (municipalities), each of which is headquartered in a prominent city, town, or village. The newest of these are the municipalities of San Rafael and Santiago Sochiapan which were created in 2003. These municipalities are grouped into regions called Huasteca Alta (with ten municipalities), Huasteca Baja (with 23 municipalities), Totonac (with 15 municipalities), Nautla (with 11 municipalities), Capital (with 33 municipalities), Sotavento (with 12 municipalities), De las Montañas (with 57 municipalities), Papaloapan (with 22 municipalities), De los Tuxtlas (with four municipalities) and Olmeca (with 25 municipalities) .

Freedom of the Press violations
According to many journalists' organizations, Veracruz is one of the most dangerous places for journalists especially after governor Javier Duarte de Ochoa came to power in December 2010.

Infrastructure

Transport
The road system in the state contains , representing 5.1% of the roads nationwide. State roads comprise  with the rest maintained by local authorities.

The state contains  of railway. Most of this is conceded by the federal government to private companies, with strategic stretches maintained directly by the government. Some of the private companies include Kansas City Southern de México and Ferrosur. These lines are used almost exclusively for the transportation of freight, which in 1999 added up to 37 million tons. Three rail lines serve the port of Veracruz exclusively. One is dedicated to the port of Coatzacalcos.

The ports of Veracruz are Tuxpan, Veracruz, Coatzacoalcos, Pajaritos, Minatitlán-Nanchital, Tecolutla, Nautla, Alvarado and Tlacotalpan. The first three are the ports for heavy cargo ships, with Veracruz the most important of the three. The others are small ports for small ships, fishing boats and tourism. All ports are operated privately with the exception of Pajaritos, which is operated by PEMEX. Port traffic in Veracruz account for 10% of all commercial traffic in the country, 23.4% of the port traffic of Mexico and 21% of all port traffic in the Gulf of Mexico and Caribbean. Goods imported through the state reach 16 out of Mexico's 31 states plus Mexico City. The port of Veracruz alone handles over 12 million tons of freight per year. Coatzacoalcos is important for its handling of petroleum products.

The state contains three major airports. “El Tajín” in Tihuatlán serving Poza Rica and “Canticas” in Minatitlán provide national service. “Heriberto Jara Corona” in the city of Veracruz provides national and international service. There are also 31 smaller regional airfields in municipalities such as Acayucán, Cazones de Herrera, Córdoba, Cuitlahuac, Juán Rodríguez Clara, Ozuluama, Platón Sánchez, Playa Vicente, Soconusco, Tamalín, Tamiahua, Tecolutla, Temapache, Tempoal and Tierra Blanca.

Media
There are 59 local newspapers and 40 magazines published in the state. These include El Dictamen, El Sol del Centro, la Opinión de Minatitlán, Diario de Xalapa, El Diario de Minatitlán, El Mundo de Córdoba, El Mundo de Orizaba, El Sol de Córdoba, El Sol de Orizaba, Esto de Veracruz, Imagen de Veracruz, La Jornada Veracruz, La Opinión de Poza Rica, Liberal del Sur, Milenio El Portal, Noreste Diario Regional Independiente, and Sotavento.

There are 202 radio stations (57 AM, 35 FM). Most are commercial or private but some are operated by non-profits and governmental agencies. There are 22 television stations; two channels are local, and the rest are repeaters from national broadcasters. Five companies provide cable and satellite television. Telmex controls over 75% of the telephone service in the state.

Major communities

Acayucan
Alvarado
Boca del Río
Camarón de Tejeda
Catemaco
Coatepec
Coatzacoalcos
Córdoba
El Jícaro, Veracruz
Martínez de la Torre
Minatitlán
Orizaba
Papantla (Papantla de Olarte)
Poza Rica
Santiago Tuxtla
San Andrés Tuxtla
Tuxpan (Túxpam/Túxpam de Rodríguez Cano)
Veracruz
Xalapa (Xalapa-Enríquez)

Notable People 

 Lorena Alarcon-Casas Wright, endocrinologist and Associate Professor at the University of Washington School of Medicine.
 Raquel Torres Cerdán, anthropologist and restaurateur
 Verónica Valerio (born 1991), singer, harpist and composer

See also
Misantla Totonac
Municipalities of Veracuz

References

Further reading
Booker, Jackie R. Veracruz Merchants, 1770-1829: A Mercantile Elite in Late Bourbon and Early Independent Mexico. Boulder, Colorado: Westview Press 1993.
Carroll, Patrick J. Blacks in Colonial Veracruz. Austin: University of Texas Press 1991.

Knaut, Andrew L. "Yellow Fever and the Late Colonial Public Health Response in the Port of Veracruz." Hispanic American Historical Review 77:4 (1997) 619–644.

External links

 Veracruz State government official website 

 
States of Mexico
Gulf Coast of Mexico
States and territories established in 1824
1824 establishments in Mexico